Temse is a short river of Mecklenburg-Vorpommern, Germany. It is a left tributary of the Warnow. It is the outflow of the Bützower See.

See also
List of rivers of Mecklenburg-Vorpommern

Rivers of Mecklenburg-Western Pomerania
Rivers of Germany